was a Japanese writer of short stories and novels and an essayist.

Biography
Born in Niigata, Sakaguchi was one of a group of young Japanese writers to rise to prominence in the years immediately following Japan's defeat in World War II. As such, Ango Sakaguchi was associated with the Buraiha or "Decadent School" (無頼派 buraiha, the school of irresponsibility and decadence), which designated a group of dissolute writers who expressed their perceived aimlessness and identity crisis of post-World War II Japan.

In 1946 he wrote his most famous essay, titled "Darakuron" ("Discourse on Decadence"), which examined the role of bushido during the war. It is widely argued that he saw postwar Japan as decadent, yet more truthful than a wartime Japan built on illusions like bushido. (The work itself does not make any claims about the meaning of decadence.)

Ango was born in 1906 and was the 12th child of 13. He was born in the middle of a Japan perpetually at war. His father was the president of the Niigata Shimbun newspaper, a politician, and a poet.

Ango wanted to be a writer at 16. He moved to Tokyo at 17, after hitting a teacher who caught him truanting. His father died from brain cancer the following year, leaving his family in massive debt. At 20, Ango taught for a year as a substitute teacher following secondary school. He became heavily involved in Buddhism and went to University to study Indian philosophy, graduating at the age of 25. Throughout his career as a student, Ango was very vocal in his opinions.

He wrote various works of literature after graduating, receiving praise from writers such as Makino Shin'ichi. His literary career started around the same time as Japan's expansion into Manchuria. At 27, he met and became friends with Yada Tsuneko. His mother died when he was 37, in the middle of World War II. He struggled for recognition as a writer for years before finally finding it with "A Personal View of Japanese Culture" in 1942, and again with "On Decadence" in 1946.

In 1947, Ango Sakaguchi wrote an ironical murder mystery, Furenzoku satsujin jiken ("The Non-serial Murder Incident", translated and published in French as Meurtres sans série), for which he received the Mystery Writers of Japan Award in 1948. Ango had a child at 48 with his wife, Michiyo Kaji. He died from a brain aneurysm at age 48 in 1955, in Kiryū, Gunma.

Works in English translation
 Literary Mischief: Sakaguchi Ango, Culture, and the War, edited by James Dorsey and Doug Slaymaker, with translations by James Dorsey.  Lanham, MA: Lexington Books, 2010.  (Critical essays by Doug Slaymaker, James Dorsey, Robert Steen, Karatani Kojin, and Ogino Anna.)
Short story
"Pearls" (Shinju, 1942)
Essays
"A Personal View of Japanese Culture" (Nihon bunka shikan, 1942)
"Discourse on Decadence" (Darakuron, 1946)
"Discourse on Decadence, Part II" (Zoku darakuron, 1946)

Short stories
 "The Idiot" (Hakuchi, 1946). Transl. by George Saitо̄ in Modern Japanese Stories, ed. by Ivan Morris. Rutland and Tokyo: Charles E. Tuttle Company, 1962, pp. 383–410.
 "I Want to Be Holding the Sea" (海を抱きしめていたい), Transl. by Shogo Oketani and Leza Lowitz in Towards a Literature of the Periphery: Manoa (Honolulu, Hawaii : 1995), 7, no. 1.
 "One Woman and the War" (Zoku Sensо̄ to hitori no onna, 1946). Transl. by Lane Dunlop in Autumn Wind and Other Stories. Rutland and Tokyo: Charles E. Tuttle Company, 1994, pp. 140–160.
 "In the Forest, Under Cherries in Full Bloom" (Sakura no mori no mankai no shita, 1947). Trans. by Jay Rubin in The Oxford Book of Japanese Short Stories, ed. by Theodore W. Goossen. Oxford and New York: Oxford University Press, 1997, pp. 187–205.
 "The War and a Woman" (Sensо̄ to hitori no onna, 1946). Transl. by Robert Zetzsche in Sakiko Nomura: Ango. Tokyo: Match and Company, 2017.
 Wind, Light, and the Twenty-Year-Old-Me (風と光と二十の私と) (abridged), translated by Reiko Seri and Doc Kane. Kobe: Maplopo, 2020.

Essay
 "A Personal View of Japanese Culture" (Nihon bunka shikan, 1942) (abridged). Transl. by James Dorsey in The Columbia Anthology of Modern Japanese Literature, Volume 1, ed. by Thomas Rimer and Van Gessel. New York: Columbia University Press, 2002, pp. 823–835.

Further reading
For more on Sakaguchi's role in postwar Japan, see John Dower's book Embracing Defeat, pp. 155–157.

Dorsey, James.  “Culture, Nationalism, and Sakaguchi Ango,” Journal of Japanese Studies vol. 27, no. 2 (Summer 2001), pp. 347~379.
Dorsey, James.  “Sakaguchi Ango,” in Modern Japanese Writers, ed. Jay Rubin (New York: Charles Scribner's Sons, 2000), pp. 31~48.
Ikoma, Albert Ryue. 1979. Sakaguchi Ango: His Life and Work. Thesis (Ph. D.)--University of Hawaii, 1979.
Nishikawa Nagao.  “Two Interpretations of Japanese Culture.”  Transl. by Mikiko Murata and Gavan McCormack. In Multicultural Japan: Palaeolithic to Postmodern, ed. by Donald Denoon, Mark Hudson, Gavan McCormack, and Tessa Morris-Suzuki, 245-64. London: Cambridge University Press, 1996.
Rubin, Jay. “From Wholesomeness to Decadence: The Censorship of Literature under the Allied Occupation.”  Journal of Japanese Studies, vol. 1, no. 1 (Spring 1985), 71-103.
Steen, Robert. 1995. To Live and Fall: Sakaguchi Ango and the Question of Literature. Thesis (Ph. D.)--Cornell, 1995.
Ed. James Dorsey and Doug Slaymaker, with translations by James Dorsey, Literary Mischief: Sakaguchi Ango, Culture, and the War. Lantham, MD: Lexington Books, 2010. Critical essays by Doug Slaymaker, James Dorsey, Ogino Anna, Karatani Kojin, and Robert Steen. Annotated English translations of "A Personal View of Japanese Culture" (「日本文化私観」, 1942), "Pearls" (「真珠」, 1942), and "Discourse on Decadence" (「堕落論」parts 1 and 2, 1946).
Yongfei Yi, 'Sakaguchi Ango's Conceptualizations of the Function of Literature in the Postwar Era', Graduate Program in East Asian Studies, The Ohio State University, 2011  
James Shield, 'Smashing the Mirror of Yamato: Sakaguchi Ango, Decadence and a (Post-metaphysical) Buddhist Critique of Culture', Journal of the International Research Center for Japanese Studies, Volume 23, Pages 225-246, September 2011,

See also
Un-Go - a 2011 anime series based on Ango's works
Aoi Bungaku - episodes 5 and 6 are based on Ango's "In the Forest, Under Cherries in Full Bloom".
 The anime Bungo Stray Dogs where a character is named after him

References

External links 
 Maplopo | Ango Sakaguchi, "Wind, Light, and the Twenty-Year-Old-Me (In English)
 Ango Sakaguchi's Discourse on Decadence Spanish translation by Juan Agustín Onís Conde
 Youyou Studio - Ango style - A Japanese-language site with information about Ango Sakaguchi and his works 
 Ango Sakaguchi's grave, archived from the original on 4 March 2016 via the Wayback Machine

1906 births
1955 deaths
Japanese essayists
Japanese mystery writers
Mystery Writers of Japan Award winners
People from Niigata (city)
20th-century essayists